Vladimir Lvovich Gershuni (18 March 1930, Moscow – 17 September 1994, Moscow) was a Soviet dissident and poet. He was a nephew of  Grigory Gershuni, a founder of the Socialist Revolutionary Party. He grew up in Soviet children's homes.

Childhood and First Arrest
In 1949, during his first year at university, Gershuni was arrested on charges of creating an underground youth organization and was sentenced to 10 years in the camps. Released in 1954, he worked as a bricklayer.

Dissident activities and forced psychiatric treatment
In the 1960s, he joined the human rights movement in the Soviet Union, signed a number of collective letters, and participated in collecting materials for Alexander Solzhenitsyn's The Gulag Archipelago, being himself one of the 255 witnesses consulted by the author. In 1969, he was re-arrested, declared insane and sent for compulsory treatment in the Orel special psychiatric hospital. He was released in 1974.

In 1978, a member of the Royal College of Psychiatrists Dr. Gerard Low-Beer visited Moscow and examined nine Soviet political dissidents, including Gershuni, and came to the conclusion that they have no signs of mental illness, which would require mandatory treatment currently or in the past.

Third arrest

In the 1970s, Gershuni resumed his dissident activities as co-editor of the samizdat magazine Poiski (Quest or Investigations, 1976–1978), and was one of the founders in 1979 of "SMOT", the Free Interprofessional Association of Workers. Simultaneously, he published humorous miniatures in the Soviet press under the pseudonym V. Lvov. In 1982, for the third time, Gershuni was arrested. This time he was charged with publishing a SMOT newsletter and placed in specialized psychiatric hospitals, first Blagoveshchensk in the Soviet Far East, then Talgar in the Almaty Region of Kazakhstan.

Like other political prisoners held in psychiatric hospitals, he was not released until 3 December 1987.

See also
Political abuse of psychiatry in the Soviet Union

References

1930 births
1994 deaths
Writers from Moscow
Soviet dissidents
Soviet human rights activists
Soviet Jews
Soviet poets
Jewish poets
Russian male poets
Soviet male writers
20th-century male writers
Political abuse of psychiatry in the Soviet Union